The Connecticut Post is a daily newspaper located in Bridgeport, Connecticut.  It serves Fairfield County and the Lower Naugatuck Valley.  Municipalities in the Post's circulation area include Ansonia, Bridgeport, Darien, Derby, Easton, Fairfield, Milford, Monroe, New Canaan, Orange, Oxford, Redding, Ridgefield, Seymour, Shelton, Stratford, Trumbull, Weston, Westport and Wilton. The newspaper is owned and operated by the Hearst Corporation, a multinational corporate media conglomerate with $4 billion in revenues. The Connecticut Post also gains revenue by offering classified advertising for job hunters with minimal regulations and separate listings for products and services.

The Post 
The paper has a weekday circulation of 53,866, a Saturday circulation of 41,768, and a Sunday circulation of 80,840, according to the Audit Bureau of Circulation, behind the Hartford Courant (264,539) and the New Haven Register (89,022). It is southwestern Connecticut's largest circulation daily newspaper. The paper competes directly with the Register in Stratford, Milford, and portions of the Lower Naugatuck Valley. Since June 2017, the Post and the Register have been under common ownership, with management led first by Hearst Connecticut Media Group president Paul Barbetta and since May 2019 by his successor Mike Deluca.

The publisher is Mike Deluca who is also the president of Hearst Connecticut Media Group. Recent editor James H. Smith departed abruptly on June 26, 2008. No reason was given to staff, but Smith later attributed his departure to "mutual agreement". Smith had attempted to take the newspaper in a different direction, stressing slice-of-life style features and enterprise and investigative work while playing down court/police coverage. He avoided layoffs despite economic pressures, opting instead to offer buyouts and drastically cut the freelance budget. In October 2019 Wendy Metcalfe was named editor-in-chief of Hearst Connecticut Media on the abrupt ouster of Matt Derienzo.

The Post employs seven editors within their departments including a digital news editor, sports editor, arts & entertainment editor, business editor, features editor, editorial page editor and photo editor. These editors work along with the managing editor and two assistant managing editors to build the newspaper daily.

The Posts coverage area presents problems as Bridgeport, Connecticut's largest city, is a poor and mostly minority area, while the surrounding eastern Fairfield County and western New Haven County area is affluent and mostly white. Consequently, while the Post does provide solid coverage of Bridgeport, most of the paper is composed of local stories regarding the surrounding towns.

History 

The newspaper was formerly the morning Bridgeport Telegram and evening Bridgeport Post before consolidating into a morning publication. The Bridgeport Telegram ran from at least 1908 to 1929 and again from 1938 to 1990. Until the mid-1980s the Post was published as an afternoon paper and the Telegram was the morning paper.

In 1981, a Post wire service editor died at his desk while a Girl Scout troop was touring the newsroom.

In 1986, a young staffer at the Post office dropped his coat with a handgun in it, and accidentally shot a bullet into the ceiling. The man had become a drug dealer on the side and was arrested in the lobby for selling cocaine by an undercover police officer working as a janitor at the building.

In 2017, the Posts offices moved from 410 State St. to 1057 Broad St. The Post had been operating at the State Street location since 1928. The change in office space was made after deciding to downsize after most of the staff had moved to Hearst Connecticut Media's headquarters in Norwalk, CT. Only 20 employees made up of local reporters, editors and photographers work at the new location.

The Post was formerly owned by Thomson Corporation, a national newspaper chain. In 2000, Thomson agreed to sell the Post for $205 million to MediaNews Group, based in Denver, Colorado, which also owned newspapers in Massachusetts and New Hampshire.

On August 8, 2008 the Hearst Corporation acquired the Connecticut Post (Bridgeport) and www.ConnPost.com, including seven non-daily newspapers, from MediaNews Group, Inc., and assumed management control of three additional daily newspapers in Fairfield County, including The Advocate (Stamford), Greenwich Time (Greenwich), and The News-Times (Danbury), which had been managed for Hearst by MediaNews under a management agreement that began in April 2007. Overall, the company publishes 24 dailies and 56 weeklies across the country.

The Hearst Corporation also has ownership in global financial services, cable channels A&E, History, Lifetime and ESPN, television stations, including WCVB-TV in Boston, and over 300 magazines.

In 2010, the Connecticut Post launched a complete re-design which included a new font and re-designed Connecticut Post header.

Some significant stories the Post has broken  include former Bridgeport Mayor Joseph Ganim's bribery scandal and former Bridgeport Mayor John Fabrizi's admission of using cocaine.

In 2008, under Smith's leadership, the Connecticut Post received its first Newspaper of the Year Award from the New England Newspaper Association.

Comedian and actor Richard Belzer, a Bridgeport native, was a paperboy and later a staff reporter for the Post, before pursuing his career as an entertainer.

See also

References

External links
Connecticut Post
Hearst Corporation
History of the Connecticut Post

Hearst Communications publications
Mass media in Bridgeport, Connecticut
Mass media in Fairfield County, Connecticut
Newspapers published in Connecticut